William Eaton or Bill Eaton may refer to:

 William Eaton (soldier) (1764–1811), United States Army soldier during the Barbary Wars
 William Eaton (athlete) (1909–1938), British long-distance runner
 William Eaton (guitarist), American luthier and guitar player
 William Eaton (scientist), American biophysicist
 William W. Eaton (1816–1898), politician from Connecticut
 William Eaton, 2nd Baron Cheylesmore (1843–1902), collector of English mezzotint portraits
 William R. Eaton (1877–1942), U.S. Representative from Colorado
 William J. Eaton (1930–2005), American journalist
 William A. Eaton (born 1952), U.S. diplomat
 William W. Eaton (epidemiologist), epidemiologist and psychiatrist, winner of the 2000 Rema Lapouse Award

See also 
 William E. Chandler (William Eaton Chandler, 1835–1917), lawyer; U.S. Secretary of the Navy and U.S. Senator from New Hampshire